Pharah is the call sign of Fareeha Amari, a fictional playable character who first appears in the 2016 video game Overwatch, a Blizzard Entertainment–developed first-person shooter. Pharah also appears in related Overwatch animated and literary media.

Development and design

Gameplay and art
Pharah was one of the first twelve Overwatch heroes introduced at BlizzCon in November 2014. In June 2015, Blizzard published a gameplay preview for Pharah. Her design features her in an experimental combat suit that emphasizes mobility and firepower, dubbed the "Raptora Mark VI". The design is similar in appearance to Gundam mecha, and features a beak-like helmet. Concept art for Pharah included a Porco Rosso-styled version of her design.<ref name=Jackson2017>{{cite web|last=Jackson|first=Gita|url=https://kotaku.com/everyone-has-a-crush-on-this-concept-art-for-overwatchs-1819617478|title=Everyone Has A Crush On This Concept Art For Overwatchs Mercy|work=Kotaku|date=October 17, 2017|accessdate=September 27, 2022}}</ref>

Pharah was designed to be an offensive combatant, equipped abilities that allow her to go airborne and a concussive blast ability.

Like other Overwatch characters, Pharah received skins, unlockable cosmetic items to change her in-game appearance. Various skins like "Mechaqueen" and "Mechatron" lean into a Gundam aesthetic and emphasize a mecha appearance for her combat suit. Two notable skins include "Thunderbird" and "Raindancer", which are based on Indigenous imagery. The skins "paint her face in red and white and remove her Eye of Horus tattoo," while also separating her hair into two braids, adorning her armor with "tribal" patterns, and depicting her helmet as a falcon decorated with grass.

In 2018, Overwatch developers made significant reworks to the game's meta. Buffs to hitscan heroes were implemented, making their fall-off damage "devastating even in long-range fights," which caused Pharah's verticality become one of her biggest vulnerabilities, in stark contrast to it being a strength before.

Story and character
Of an Egyptian and Indigenous Canadian background, the character's full name is Fareeha Amari. She is a Giza-based security chief. Her mother Ana was a member of Overwatch, a global peacekeeping force. Aspiring to follow in her mother's footsteps, she enlisted in and rose up through the officer ranks of the Egyptian army. Before being able to join Overwatch, the organization disbanded, and Fareeha would later instead become an officer of the Giza-based Helix Security International. Under the call sign "Pharah", she is tasked with defending an artificial intelligence research facility.

The character was originally named "Mercy", which would later become the name for a character originally named "Angelica". However, during early testing stages of the game, testers would get confused when asked to switch to Mercy (or the character now known as Pharah). Upon these requests, they would often switch to Angelica. To quell this issue, game developers renamed Angelica as Mercy, and temporarily renamed Mercy as "Rocket Dude". The character would later be named "Rocket Queen", before her name was finalized as "Pharah".

Pharah was long-teased as being mixed race, specifically of an Indigenous Canadian heritage, in addition to her already publicly known Egyptian background. In an issue of Overwatchs tie-in comic series, Pharah's father is hinted at, "although Blizzard never confirmed whether the slight, graying man Pharah was seen with in the story was her father or her boyfriend." However, an April 2017 update for the game all but confirmed this character as her father.

The character is voiced by Jen Cohn in the English version of the game. The character's German version voice actress, Ghadah Al-Akel, was replaced in a 2017 update for the game, without her knowledge. 

Gameplay
Filling an offensive role in gameplay, Pharah is classified as a "Damage" hero. Along with D.Va, Pharah is the most mobile character in Overwatch, able to reach any point on a map.Polygon has described her kit as "straightforward". She is equipped with a rocket launcher, which has long range and deals high damage. While her explosive rockets damage all enemies nearby to its impact location, a direct hit on an enemy deals significant damage. Pharah's passive ability, "Hover Jets", allows her to slowly gain height and hover in the air while using her jets. To rapidly gain height, she can use her "Jump Jet" ability. Her "Concussive Blast" ability sees Pharah use her equipped wrist rockets pushing targets far from their blast radius. Finally, her "Barrage" ultimate ability shoots a stream of highly-damaging rockets for a 3 second duration. In Overwatch 2, Pharah enjoys an additional passive ability common to all "Damage" characters: for a short period of time after eliminating an enemy, she has a faster movement speed and can quickly reload her rocket launcher.

Due to their flight abilities working well together, Pharah and Mercy players often paired together in the game's meta during its first two years of release. The combination was dubbed "Pharmercy" by players and video game media outlets.

Appearances
Video games
As Overwatch lacks a traditional story mode its lore and character backgrounds, including Pharah's, are instead shown in-game through its map design and character voice lines. Pharah was a playable character in Overwatch at launch. In Overwatch 2, she is available to new players immediately.

ComicsOverwatch utilizes transmedia storytelling to expand its lore. Pharah has made multiple appearances in Overwatch-related comics. She first appeared in "Mission Statement", a May 2016 issue of the game's tie-in Overwatch digital comic series. In November, she appeared in "Reflections", another Overwatch issue; she appears in a panel with her father having dinner and watching hockey at a restaurant in Canada.

Pharah would appear in a December 2021 issue of New Blood, a five-issue comic miniseries. In it, she meets with Cassidy and also gets in touch with her mother.

Reception

Among players who opt for DPS (damage per second) characters, Pharah is a popular choice. Fans of the game often pair Pharah with Mercy in fan art. This ship is nicknamed "Pharmercy" by fans of the game.

In 2018, Joseph Knoop of The Daily Dot wrote negatively of the character, lamenting Blizzard having "done surprisingly little with Pharah as a character." Knoop added, "we also got an unimpressive comic that shows her grow into a more caring commander. There's already a ton to mine there for emotional payoff, but just like Pharah's sky-high leaps, it seems like she'll always be out of reach." 

Pharah's "Thunderbird" and "Raindancer" skins drew criticism from fans online, who argued the skins were culturally appropriating Indigenous imagery. Fans also questioned why the skins were based on Indigenous imagery, when Pharah had long been detailed as of Egyptian origin. When asked about these skins in an interview with Kotaku, Overwatch game director Jeff Kaplan stated that upon seeing the concept art for the skins, the development team was impressed. While internally questioning whether or not to use the skins for Pharah, the team indeed opted to implement the skins into the game. While Kaplan stated the development team was open to removing the skin if fans felt a line was crossed, the skin ultimately remained in the game and Pharah was confirmed to be half-Indigenous Canadian. 

After the Reflections issue, featuring Pharah having dinner with her Indigenous father, Cecilia D'Anastasio of Kotaku reflected on the controversy, asking "was Pharah's somewhat obtuse lore added to quell players' accusations of cultural appropriation? It's hard to say," while citing a "strongly-worded Medium post by a Dia Lacina, a Native woman," that "questioned whether Pharah's father is the 'Convenient Indian.'" Lacina also opined that "corporate interests and fandom demands aligned so they can make those skins 'acceptable' while getting bonus points for finally having a Native in Overwatch''s lore."

See also
Characters of Overwatch

References

Comics characters introduced in 2016
Female characters in comics
Female characters in video games
Fictional characters introduced in 2014
Fictional Egyptian people
Fictional female lieutenants
Fictional Indigenous peoples in Canada
Fictional military captains
Fictional private military members
Overwatch characters
Race-related controversies in video games
Video game characters introduced in 2016
Woman soldier and warrior characters in video games